AH-494 is a potent and selective, water-soluble full agonist at the 5HT7 serotonin receptor. It is a close derivative of the known chemical probe 5-Carboxamidotryptamine, as well as of the more lipophilic indole-imidazoles: AGH-107 and AGH-192. It has been shown to exhibit favorable ADMET profile in in vitro assays.

See also 
 AGH-107
 AGH-192
 Frovatriptan

References 

Serotonin receptor agonists
Indoles
Iodoarenes
Imidazoles